The 11th African Games took place from September 4–19, 2015 in Brazzaville, Republic of the Congo. This edition marked the 50th anniversary of the Games, as well as their return to Brazzaville, which hosted the first edition in 1965.

Host awarding
Ghana, Kenya and Congo all showed interest in bidding for the 11th edition of the Games. On September 14, 2011, the Supreme Council for Sports in Africa awarded the rights to Brazzaville to host.

Name change
In January 2012 during the Executive Council meeting of the African Union held in Addis Ababa, Ethiopia was taken a decision for the name change from All-Africa Games to African Games. The 11th edition of Brazzaville 2015 started under this new name.

Opening ceremony
The opening ceremony was held on 4 September 2015 at the newly built Kintele Stadium. Congolese national anthem started the ceremony, performed by Abel Mona. Parade of nations then started with Mozambique entering first as the previous host in 2011 and Republic of Congo came out last as the current host. In the artistic sequence, performers dressed with the colors of Congolese flag formed the word bienvenue (welcome) and followed by various dances and the lighting of the torch.

Participating nations 

The Sahrawi Arab Democratic Republic were to take part in the games for the first time. However, because the country was not yet affiliated with the international federations of the sports that it had intended to attend, the Congolese organising committee determined its athletes could not participate. Morocco protested the decision by pulling out of the Games.

 (235)

 (40)

 (host)

 (298)

 (364)

 (7)

 (79)

 (573)

 Sahrawi Arab Democratic Republic
 
 (287)

 (150)

 (90)

 (111)

Sports
22 separate sports have been announced for the 2015 African Games (2 demonstration), and two additional disability sports (Athletics and Weightlifting):

Athletics (46 + 28)
Badminton (6)
Basketball (2)
Beach volleyball (2)
Boxing (13)
Cycling (6)
Fencing (12)
Football (2)
Gymnastics (16)
Handball (2)
Judo (14)
Karate (16)
Pétanque (2)
Swimming (42)
Tennis (6)
Table tennis (7)
Taekwondo (16)
Volleyball (2)
Weightlifting (45 + 14)
Wrestling (24)
Nzango (demonstration) 
Pharaoh Boxing (demonstration)

Calendar
The schedule of the games was as follows. The calendar is to be completed with event finals information.

Venues

Venues used in these Games mostly located in the new Kintele Sport Complex in the northern part of Brazzaville and the existing Alphonse Massemba-Débat Sport Complex. The list below shows venues used in these Games.

Kintele Sports Complex

Other venues

Medal table
323 medal events in 20 sports (consist of 2 para sports but exclude 2 demonstration sports).

Key
 Host nation (Congo)

Source:

Broadcasters

Source:

References

External links

 
All-Africa Games
All-Africa Games
All-Africa Games
African Games
Multi-sport events in the Republic of the Congo
Sports competitions in Brazzaville
21st century in Brazzaville
September 2015 sports events in Africa